Vasily Mikhailovich Blokhin (7 January 1895 – 3 February 1955) was a Soviet and Russian major general who served as the chief executioner of the NKVD under the administrations of Genrikh Yagoda, Nikolay Yezhov, and Lavrentiy Beria.

Hand-picked for the position by Joseph Stalin in 1926, Blokhin led a company of executioners that performed and supervised numerous mass killings during Stalin's reign, mostly during the Great Purge and World War II. He is recorded as having executed tens of thousands of prisoners by his own hand, including his killing of about 7,000 Polish prisoners of war during the Katyn massacre in spring 1940, making him the most prolific official executioner in recorded world history. Blokhin was forced into retirement following the death of Stalin, and he died in 1955.

Early life and career
Blokhin, born into a peasant family on 7 January 1895, served in the Imperial Russian Army during World War I, and joined the Russian Communist Party (Bolsheviks) and the Soviet state security agency Cheka in March 1921. Though records are scant, he was evidently noted for both his pugnaciousness and his mastery of what Joseph Stalin termed chernaya rabota ("wetwork", or literally, "black work"): assassinations, torture, intimidation, and executions conducted clandestinely. Once he gained Stalin's attention, he was quickly promoted and within six years was appointed the head of the purposefully created Kommandatura Branch of the Administrative Executive Department of the NKVD. This branch was a company-sized element created by Stalin specifically for wetwork. Headquartered at the Lubyanka in Moscow, its members were all approved by Stalin and took their orders directly from him, which ensured the unit's longevity despite three bloody purges of the NKVD.

As senior executioner, Blokhin had the official title of commandant of the internal prison at the Lubyanka, which allowed him to carry out his duties with a minimum of scrutiny and no official paperwork. Although most of the estimated 828,000 NKVD executions conducted in Stalin's lifetime were performed by local Chekists in concert with NKVD troikas, mass executions were overseen by specialist executioners from the Kommandantura. In addition to overseeing the mass executions, Blokhin personally pulled the trigger in all of the individual high-profile executions conducted in the Soviet Union during his tenure, including those of the Old Bolsheviks convicted at the Moscow Trials; Marshal of the Soviet Union Mikhail Tukhachevsky (convicted at a secret trial); and two of the three killed NKVD Chiefs (Genrikh Yagoda in 1938 and Nikolay Yezhov in 1940) he had once served. He was awarded the Badge of Honour for his service in 1937.

Role in the Katyn massacre

Blokhin's most infamous act was the April 1940 execution by shooting of about 7,000 Polish prisoners interned in the Ostashkov prisoner of war camp in the Katyn forest. The majority were military and police officers who had been captured following the Soviet invasion of Poland in 1939. The event's infamy also stems from the Stalin regime's orchestration of the murders, and the subsequent Allied propaganda campaign which blamed Nazi Germany for the massacres, aided by the Western Allies in order to preserve morale.

In 1990, as part of Glasnost, Mikhail Gorbachev gave the Polish government the files on the massacres at Katyn, Starobilsk and Kalinin (now Tver), revealing Stalin's involvement. Based on the 4 April secret order from Stalin to NKVD Chief Lavrentiy Beria as well as NKVD Order No. 00485, which still applied, the executions were carried out over 28 consecutive nights at the specially constructed basement execution chamber at the NKVD headquarters in Kalinin, and were assigned, by name, directly to Blokhin, making him the official executioner of the NKVD.

Blokhin initially decided on an ambitious quota of 300 executions per night, and engineered an efficient system in which the prisoners were individually led to a small antechamber—which had been painted red and was known as the "Leninist room"—for a brief and cursory positive identification, before being handcuffed and led into the execution room next door. The room was specially designed with padded walls for soundproofing, a sloping concrete floor with a drain and hose, and a log wall for the prisoners to stand against. Blokhin would stand waiting behind the door in his executioner garb: a leather butcher's apron, leather hat, and shoulder-length leather gloves. Then, without a hearing, the reading of a sentence or any other formalities, each prisoner was brought in and restrained by guards while Blokhin shot him once in the base of the skull with a German Walther Model 2 .25 ACP pistol. He had brought a briefcase full of his own Walther pistols, since he did not trust the reliability of the standard-issue Soviet TT-30 for the frequent, heavy use he intended. The use of a German pocket pistol, which was commonly carried by German police and intelligence agents, also provided plausible deniability of the executions if the bodies were discovered later.

An estimated 30 local NKVD agents, guards and drivers were pressed into service to escort prisoners to the basement, confirm identification, then remove the bodies and hose down the blood after each execution. Although some of the executions were carried out by Senior Lieutenant of State Security Andrei Rubanov, Blokhin was the primary executioner and, true to his reputation, liked to work continuously and rapidly without interruption. In keeping with NKVD policy and the overall "wet" nature of the operation, the executions were conducted at night, starting at dark and continuing until just prior to dawn. The bodies were continuously loaded onto covered flat-bed trucks through a back door in the execution chamber and trucked, twice a night, to Mednoye, where Blokhin had arranged for a bulldozer and two NKVD drivers to dispose of bodies at an unfenced site.

Blokhin and his team worked without pause for 10 hours each night, with Blokhin executing an average of one prisoner every three minutes. At the end of the night, Blokhin provided vodka to all his men. On 27 April 1940, Blokhin secretly received the Order of the Red Banner and a modest monthly pay premium as a reward from Joseph Stalin for his "skill and organization in the effective carrying out of special tasks". His tally of 7,000 shot in 28 days remains the most organized and protracted mass murder by a single individual on record, and caused him being named the Guinness World Record holder for 'Most Prolific Executioner' in 2010.

Personal life
Blokhin was married to Natalia Aleksandrovna Blokhina (1901–1967), and had a son, Nikolai Vasilievich Baranov (1916–1998).

Retirement and death
Blokhin was forcibly retired following Stalin's death in March 1953. However, his "irreproachable service" was publicly noted by Beria at the time of his departure. When Beria himself was removed in June, Blokhin's rank was stripped from him in the de-Stalinization campaigns of Nikita Khrushchev.

Already an alcoholic, Blokhin died on 3 February 1955, aged 60. The official cause of death was listed as suicide; however, his personnel files recorded that he died due to a heart attack.

Honours and awards
 Honorary Worker of the Cheka-GPU (V) No. 498
 Honorary Worker of the Cheka-GPU (XV) (1932)
 Order of the Red Star (1936)
 Order of the Badge of Honour (1937)
 Order of the Red Banner, twice (1940, 1944)
 Order of the Red Banner of Labour (1943)
 Order of Lenin (1945)
 Order of the Patriotic War, 1st class (1945)

Notes

See also
 Mass killings under communist regimes

References

External links 
 Remembering Katyn, Suicide of Vasily Blokhin

1895 births
1955 deaths
Capital punishment in the Soviet Union
Communist Party of the Soviet Union members
Genocide perpetrators
Great Purge perpetrators
Katyn massacre
NKVD officers
People from Suzdalsky District
People from Suzdalsky Uyezd
Perpetrators of World War II prisoner of war massacres
Recipients of the Order of Lenin
Recipients of the Order of the Red Banner
Recipients of the Order of the Red Banner of Labour
Recipients of the Order of the Red Star
Russian executioners
Russian mass murderers
Russian military personnel of World War I
Soviet executioners
Soviet major generals
Soviet mass murderers
Suicides in the Soviet Union